Lancaster House in Whitworth Street, Manchester, England, is a former packing and shipping warehouse built between 1905 and 1910 for Lloyd's Packing Warehouses Limited, which had, by merger, become the dominant commercial packing company in early 20th century Manchester. It is in the favoured Edwardian Baroque style and constructed with a steel frame clad with granite at the base and Accrington red brick and orange terracotta. The back of the building is plain red brick. It is a Grade II* listed building as of 3 October 1974.
    
The building was designed by Harry S. Fairhurst, who had become "the leading expert in the design of these advanced warehouses". Fairhurst was also responsible for Bridgewater House opposite, the neighbouring India House and, perhaps, Asia House, although that building has also been attributed to I.R.E. Birkett.
    
Fairhurst's huge buildings are "steel-framed and built to high-quality fireproof specifications".

Lancaster House shares a common plinth and eaves with its neighbour, India House and is connected by an ornate two storeys high circular Art Nouveau wrought iron gate with a pendant lamp.

The building has since been converted into residential flats and separated into two buildings that are seven storeys tall. The first is located on 71 Whitworth Street, Manchester and the second is located on the adjoining street of 80 Princess Street, Manchester. The corner entrance below currently provides access to a public house named O'Sheas Irish Bar.

Lancaster House is part of a conservation area in Manchester City Centre that reflects the historical importance of the textile industry in the city. The conservation area was designated by Manchester City Council in September 1974, and was bounded by Oxford Street, Portland Street, Abingdon Street, Bloom Street, Chorlton Street, Cobourg Street and the Piccadilly to Oxford Road railway viaduct. It was extended in June 1985 to include an area bounded by Whitworth Street, London Road and the above viaduct.

The nearest train stations to Lancaster House are Oxford Road Station (0.2 miles) and Manchester Piccadilly Train Station (0.4 miles).

See also

Grade II* listed buildings in Greater Manchester
Listed buildings in Manchester-M1

References

Further reading
 Hartwell, Clare, Hyde, Matthew and Pevsner, Nikolaus, The Buildings of England: Lancashire: Manchester and the South East (2004) Yale University Press
 Hartwell, Clare, Pevsner Architectural Guides: Manchester (2002) Yale University Press

Commercial buildings in Manchester
Office buildings in Manchester
Warehouses in England
Grade II* listed buildings in Manchester
Grade II* listed commercial buildings
Grade II* listed office buildings
Edwardian architecture